Post-truth is a term that refers to the 21st century widespread documentation of and concern about disputes over public truth claims.  
The term's academic development refers to the theories and research that explain the historically specific causes and the effects of the phenomenon.

While the term was used academically and publicly before 2016 (post-truth politics), Oxford Dictionaries popularly defined it as "relating to and denoting circumstances in which objective facts are less influential in shaping public opinion than appeals to emotion and personal belief." The term was named Oxford Dictionaries Word of the Year in 2016, after the term's proliferation in the 2016 United States presidential election and the Brexit referendum in the United Kingdom. Oxford dictionaries further notes that post-truth was often used as an adjective to signal a distinctive kind of politics – post-truth politics.

Some scholars argue that post-truth has similarities with past moral, epistemic, and political debates about relativism, postmodernity, and dishonesty in politics. Others insist that post-truth is specifically concerned with 21st century communication technologies and cultural practices.

Historical precedents in philosophy 
Post-truth is about a historical problem regarding truth in everyday life, especially politics. But truth has long been one of the major preoccupations of philosophy. Truth is also one of the most complicated concepts in the history of philosophy, and much of the research and public debate about post-truth assumes a particular theory of truth, what philosophers call a correspondence theory of truth. The most prominent theory of truth, though with its share of critics, is correspondence theory, roughly, where words correspond to an accepted or mutually available reality to be examined and confirmed. Another major theory of truth is coherence theory, where truth is not just about one claim but a series of statements that cohere about the world. Several academic experts note that the emphasis on philosophical debates about truth have little to do with the concept of post-truth as it has historically emerged in popular politics (see post-truth politics), not in philosophy. As the philosopher Julian Baggini explains: The merits of these competing theories are of mainly academic concern. When people debate whether there were weapons of mass destruction in Saddam Hussain's Iraq, whether global warming is real and anthropogenic, or whether austerity is necessary, their disagreements are not the consequence of competing theories of truth. No witness need ask a judge which theory she has in mind when asked to promise to tell the truth, the whole truth and nothing but the truth.

Why then has truth become so problematic in the world outside academic philosophy? One reason is that there is major disagreement and uncertainty concerning what counts as a reliable source of truth. For most of human history, there was some stable combination of trust in religious texts and leaders, learned experts and the enduring folk wisdom called common sense. Now, it seems, virtually nothing is universally taken as an authority. This leaves us having to pick our own experts or simply to trust our guts.It follows that according to experts who approach the concept of post-truth as something historically specific, as a contemporary sociological phenomenon, post-truth theory is only remotely related to traditional debates in philosophy about the nature of truth. In other words, post-truth as a contemporary phenomenon is not about asking "what is truth?" or "is X true?" but "why don't we agree that this or that is true?" A broad range of scholarship increasingly insists a breakdown in institutional authority for truth-telling (government, news media, especially) ushered by new media and communication technologies of user-generated-content, new media editing technologies (visual, audio-visual), and a saturating promotional culture has resulted in confusion and games of truth-telling, even truth markets.

However, not all commentators treat post-truth as a historically specific phenomenon discussed through implicit correspondence, coherence, or pragmatist theories of truth. They discuss it within a philosophical tradition that asks what truth is. Friedrich Nietzsche is sometimes cited in this camp of post-truth commentators.

Friedrich Nietzsche 
Friedrich Nietzsche is sometimes invoked as a predecessor to theories of post-truth.  He argues that humans create the concepts through which they define the good and the just, thereby replacing the concept of truth with the concept of value, and grounding reality in the human will and will to power.

In his 1873 essay Truth and Lying in an Extra-Moral Sense, Nietzsche holds that humans create truth about the world through their use of metaphor, myth, and poetry. He writes,If someone hides an object behind a bush, then seeks and finds it there, that seeking and finding is not very laudable: but that is the way it is with the seeking and finding of "truth" within the rational sphere. If I define the mammal and then after examining a camel declare, "See, a mammal", a truth is brought to light, but it is of limited value. I mean, it is anthropomorphic through and through and contains not a single point that would be "true  and universally valid, apart from man. The investigator into such truths is basically seeking just the metamorphosis of the world into man; he is struggling to understand the world as a human-like thing and acquires at best a feeling of assimilation.

Max Weber

Critical theory and continental philosophy

Some influential philosophers are skeptical of the division between facts and values. They argue that scientific facts are socially produced through relations of power.

Bruno Latour
The French philosopher Bruno Latour has been criticized for contributing to the intellectual foundations for post-truth. In 2018, the New York Times ran a profile on Bruno Latour and post-truth politics. According to the article,  However, the article claims that it is a misinterpretation to claim that Latour doesn't believe in reality or that truth is relative: Had they been among our circus that day, Latour's critics might have felt that there was something odd about the scene – the old adversary of science worshipers kneeling before the altar of science. But what they would have missed – what they have always missed – was that Latour never sought to deny the existence of gravity. He has been doing something much more unusual: trying to redescribe the conditions by which this knowledge comes to be known.

The disputable reputation of Latour as a "fact-denier", stemmed from his article in La Recherche (1998), a French monthly magazine. Here Latour discusses the discovery in 1976, by French scientists working on the mummy of the pharaoh Ramses II, that his death was due to tuberculosis. Latour asks: 

In this sense, Latour (or Michel Foucault as well) draws attention to the institutional and practical contingencies for producing knowledge (which in science is always changing at slower and faster rates).

Hannah Arendt 
Hannah Arendt has been cited as an important conceptual resource for post-truth theory in that she attempted to theorize something historically shifting, instead of meditating on the nature of truth itself. In her essay Lying in Politics (1972), Hannah Arendt describes what she terms defactualization, or the inability to discern fact from fiction – a concept very close to what we now understand by post-truth. The essay's central theme is the thoroughgoing political deception that was unveiled with the leaking of the Pentagon Papers in 1971. Her main target of critique is the professional "problem-solvers" tasked with solving American foreign policy "problems" during the Vietnam War, and who comprised the group that authored the McNamara report.
Arendt distinguishes defactualization from deliberate falsehood and from lying. She writes,The deliberate falsehood deals with contingent facts; that is, with matters that carry no inherent truth within themselves, no necessity to be as they are. Factual truths are never compellingly true. The historian knows how vulnerable is the whole texture of facts in which we spend our daily life; it is always in danger of being perforated by single lies or torn to shreds by the organized lying of groups, nations, or classes, or denied and distorted, often carefully covered up by reams of falsehoods or simply allowed to fall into oblivion. She goes on,There always comes the point beyond which lying becomes counterproductive. This point is reached when the audience to which the lies are addressed is forced to disregard altogether the distinguishing line between truth and falsehood in order to be able to survive. Truth or falsehoodit does not matter which anymore, if your life depends on your acting as though you trusted; truth that can be relied on disappears entirely from public life, and with it the chief stabilizing factor in the ever-changing affairs of men. Arendt faults the Vietnam era problem-solvers with being overly rational, "trained in translating all factual contents into the language of numbers and percentages", and out of touch with the facts of "given reality." Contrary to contemporary definitions of post-truth that emphasize a reliance on emotion over facts and evidence, Arendt's notion of defactualization identifies hyper-rationality as the mechanism that blurs the line between "fact and fantasy": the problem-solvers "were indeed to a rather frightening degree above 'sentimentality' and in love with 'theory', the world of sheer mental effort. They were eager to find formulas, preferably expressed in a pseudo-mathematical language..."

Arendt writes: "What these problem-solvers have in common with down-to-earth liars is the attempt to get rid of facts and the confidence that this should be possible because of the inherent contingency of facts." She explains that deception and even self-deception are rendered meaningless in a defactualized world, for both rely on preserving the distinction between truth and falsehood. On the other hand, in a defactualized environment, the individual "loses all contact with not only his audience, but also the real world, which will still catch up with him because he can remove his mind from it but not his body."

Arendt specifically pointed to advertising (and what has recently been described as an all-encompassing "promotional culture") as having played a primary role in creating knowledge conditions of "ready to buy" that contemporary thinkers describe as characteristic of post-truth. 

Referring to the aforementioned concept of "defactualization" by Arendt, but applying it to the information society of the twenty-first century, Byung-Chul Han argues that a "new nihilism" is emerging, in which the lie is no longer passed off as truth, or in which the truth is disavowed as a lie. Rather it is the very distinction between truth and falsehood that is undermined. Anyone who knowingly lies and resists the truth, paradoxically recognizes it. Lying is possible only where the distinction between truth and falsehood is intact. The liar does not lose touch with the truth. His faith in reality does not waver. The liar is not a nihilist, he does not question truth itself. The more determined he lies, the more the truth is confirmed. "Fake news" are not lies: they attack "facticity" itself. They "de-facticize" reality. When Donald Trump offhandedly says whatever suits him, he is not a classic liar knowingly distorting reality, as to do that one would need to know it. He is rather indifferent to the truth of facts.

Contemporary evaluation 

Carl Sagan, a famous astronomer and science communicator, argued in his work The Demon-Haunted World: Science as a Candle in the Dark:

Carl Sagan's words are thought to be a prediction of a "post-truth" or "alternative facts" world.

In the context of politics, post-truth has recently been applied to the 2016 and 2020 U.S. presidential elections, Brexit, the COVID-19 "infodemic", and the conditions that led to the storming of the US capital on January 6, 2021. The historian Timothy Snyder wrote of post-truth and the 2021 storming of the United States Capitol:

The writer George Gillett has suggested that the term "post-truth" mistakenly conflates empirical and ethical judgements, writing that the supposedly "post-truth" movement is in fact a rebellion against "expert economic opinion becoming a surrogate for values-based political judgements".

See also 
 Consensus reality
 Philosophical skepticism
 Social constructionism
 Truth by consensus
 Truthiness

References

Further reading
 Abraham, Praveen & Mathew, Raisun (2021). The Post-Truth Era: Literature and Media, Authorspress
 
 Kakutani, Michiko.  "The Death of Truth" Penguin Random House (August 2019) 
 McIntyre, Lee.  "Post Truth" MIT Press (February 2018)
 

Concepts in political philosophy
Social influence